Plaka is a settlement of the Dio-Olympos municipality. Before the 2011 local government reform it was part of the municipality of Litochoro. The 2011 census recorded 192 inhabitants in the village. Plaka is a part of the community of Litochoro.

See also
 List of settlements in the Pieria regional unit

References

Populated places in Pieria (regional unit)